Mandaikadu Amman Temple is a Hindu temple where Sarasvati is the prime deity. It is located near Colachel in the western coast of Kanyakumari district, Tamil Nadu. This is one among the most renowned and important Hindu temples in the district. 

This temple is near the sea shore is a sought after pilgrim centre for both people of Tamil Nadu and Kerala. The Kodai festival at Mondaicaudu is a major celebration in the region and this temple is called as women sabarimala. To accommodate the large populations special buses run between Nagercoil and nearby towns at the time, there are also chain services operated from Thiruvananthapuram. The idol here is unique and is earthy. The worship is also unique as it is not forbidden to cook and eat non-vegetarian foods, as in most other major Hindu temples, during the festival. One can see meat being cooked during the Ponkala days around the temple.  

The goddess of this temple, Mondaicaud Amman is also linked with Ayya Vaikundar and is detailed in Akilathirattu Ammanai, the holy text of Ayyavazhi. Akilathirattu is the main source of reference which addresses the divine nature of the prime deity though the stala purana and the related beliefs are mentioned in few other texts too.

References 
 Gazetteers of India, Tamil Nadu State, Kanniyakumari District, pages 1186-1188, Places of Interest, Mondaikadu Amman Temple.
 Aithiga Mala, Kottarathil Shangunni, 1889,  Mondaikkattuu Ammanum Kodaiyum.

Citations 

Hindu temples in Kanyakumari district
Hindu temples